The Black River (Jamaica) is a river of Jamaica.

See also 
 List of rivers of Jamaica

References 
General
  GEOnet Names Server 
 OMC Map
 CIA Map
 Ford, Jos C. and Finlay, A.A.C. (1908).The Handbook of Jamaica. Jamaica Government Printing Office

Inline

Rivers of Jamaica